Ameinu ("our people") is an American Jewish Zionist organization. Established in 2004 as the successor to the Labor Zionist Alliance, it is the continuation of Labor Zionist activity in the United States that began with the founding of Poale Zion, which came together in the period 1906. 

Ameinu is headquartered in New York City and is governed by an elected national board, led by its president, Kenneth Bob. Local activity is carried out through its chapters in New York, Los Angeles, Chicago, Detroit, St. Louis, Washington, D.C., the San Francisco Bay Area, and Philadelphia.

Activities 

Ameninu's tagline is "Liberal Values: Progressive Israel," expressing their progressive orientation and engagement with political and grassroots activists in Israel and the United States. Through its website, electronic newsletter, print publications, and local programming, Ameinu educates around issues of Middle East peace, environmental concerns, Jewish-Arab relations, the social gap in Israel and America, and more. In addition, the organization sponsors educational missions to Israel.

Israeli strategic partners 
Ameinu has established strategic partnerships with Israeli organizations to foster a deeper connection between American Jews and Israel and to financially support the organization's work. NISPED (the Negev Institute for Strategic of Peace Development) addresses economic development and cooperation between Arabs and Jews living inside Israel as well as between Israelis and Palestinians. Yedid: The Association for Community Empowerment, operates self-empowerment centers in towns and small cities throughout Israel serving the weakest populations of Israeli society.

Advocacy 
Ameinu advocates within the American Jewish community around a variety of issues. In the past, Ameinu has taken positions in support of Israeli–Palestinian peace initiatives such as the Geneva Accord and the People's Voice, in support of the Israeli disengagement from Gaza, opposing divestment from Israel, condemning calls by Iran's president, Mahmoud Ahmadinejad, for the destruction of Israel, in opposition to the destruction of Bedouin villages in Israel, criticizing Reverend John Hagee's anti-Catholicism, and on other issues. In 2007 Ameinu took a leading role in organizing a pro-peace rally in Annapolis at the time of the Annapolis Peace Conference convened by President George W. Bush. In 2008, the organization published a booklet entitled "Progressive Zionist Answers to the Anti-Israel Left" for use in communities and on campuses.

Youth and student affiliates 
Ameinu provides funding for Habonim Dror North America, a Zionist youth movement. Ameinu co-founded the Union of Progressive Zionists student organization and provides funding for its activities as well.

National and international associations 

Ameinu is a member of a number of the umbrella organizations including the Conference of Presidents of Major American Jewish Organizations, American Zionist Movement, Inter-Agency Task Force on Israeli Arab Issues, and the American Israel Public Affairs Committee (AIPAC). Ameinu is the United States affiliate of the World Labor Zionist Movement and cooperates actively with its sister organization, Ameinu Australia.

External links
Official website
Facebook Group

References

American Israel Public Affairs Committee
American Zionist Movement
Zionist organizations
Jewish-American political organizations
Zionism in the United States
Organizations
Progressive organizations in the United States
Labor Zionism